Salapia (also called Salpe and Salpi) is an ancient settlement and bishopric in Daunia, Italy near Cerignola and Manfredonia. The settlement was probably built for and named after the salt marsh - the ancient Lake Salpi is now Saline di Margherita di Savoia. Salapia is mentioned by Pliny the Elder, Ptolemy and probably the "Elpia" of Strabo, but according to Smith (1857) in relation to the later town, and not an earlier original settlement.

Bishop of Salpi
Salapia had a bishop as early as A.D. 314, but the bishopric was later removed to Trani. The titular bishopric "Bishop of Salpi" remained active till the Council of Trent.

References

Archaeological sites in Apulia